Greatest! is a compilation album by American singer-songwriter Johnny Cash. It was released on October 19, 1959, by Sun Records after Cash had left the label and signed with Columbia Records. The album is made of songs Cash recorded for Sun prior to leaving the label. The album was re-issued in 2003 by Varèse Sarabande with four additional tracks, two of them being alternate versions of songs already on the album.

The tracks on Greatest! were recorded between July 1955 and July 1958. Six out of the twelve songs became singles, with "Get Rhythm" topping the Country charts and becoming the most successful one.

Track listing

Charts 
Singles - Billboard (United States)

References 

1959 albums
Johnny Cash albums
Sun Records albums
Albums produced by Sam Phillips
Varèse Sarabande albums
Albums recorded at Sun Studio
Albums produced by Jack Clement